Manuel 'Manu' Palancar Belloso (born 1 January 1990) is a Spanish footballer who plays for Coria CF as a defender.

Club career
Born in Seville, Andalusia, Palancar graduated from local Real Betis' youth system, making his senior debuts with the C-team in the 2009–10 season, also appearing with the reserves in Segunda División B. On 6 March 2011 he made his professional debut, playing the last 10 minutes in a 4–1 home win over UD Las Palmas.

On 11 May 2012 Palancar renewed his link with the Verdiblancos, penning until 2014. He would spend the rest of his spell with the B's, however.

On 11 August 2013 Palancar signed for Real Balompédica Linense in the third level. Roughly a year later he was released, and joined Tercera División side Coria CF on 30 January 2015.

References

External links
 
  

1990 births
Living people
People from Seville
Spanish footballers
Footballers from Andalusia
Association football defenders
Segunda División players
Segunda División B players
Tercera División players
Real Betis players
Real Balompédica Linense footballers